Krousa is a settlement in the Xanthi regional unit of Greece.

External links
Krousa Map

See also 
 List of settlements in the Xanthi regional unit

Populated places in Xanthi (regional unit)